Ji-yeon, also spelled Ji-yun, Ji-yon, Ji-yean, Jee-yeon, Jee-yon, Chee-yun, Chi-yun, Chi-yon is a Korean feminine given name.  The meaning differs based on the hanja used to write each syllable of the name. There are 61 hanja with the reading "ji" and  56 hanja with the reading "yeon" on the South Korean government's official list of hanja which may be registered for use in given names. Ji-yeon was the seventh-most popular name for baby girls born in South Korea in 1980.

People with this name include:

Entertainers
Myung Ji-yun (born 1975), South Korean actress
Gummy (singer) (born Park Ji-yeon, 1981), South Korean singer
Lina (South Korean singer) (born Lee Ji-yeon, 1984), South Korean musical actress and singer
Lim Ji-yeon (born 1990), South Korean actress
Park Ji-yeon (born 1993), South Korean singer, member of girl group T-ara
Kei (singer) (born Kim Ji-yeon, 1995), South Korean singer, member of girl group Lovelyz
Bona (singer) (born Kim Ji-yeon, 1995), South Korean singer, member of girl group Cosmic Girls

Sportspeople
Hong Ji-yeon (born 1970), South Korean volleyball player
Nam Jie-youn (born 1983), South Korean volleyball player
Kim Ji-yeon (born 1988), South Korean sabre fencer
Ji Yeon Kim (fighter) (born 1988), South Korean mixed martial artist
Seo Ji-yeon (born 1993), South Korean sabre fencer
Choi Ji-yeon (born 1998), South Korean ice hockey player

Others
Melissa Lee (Korean name Lee Jiyun; born 1960s), South Korean-born New Zealand politician
Kim Chee-yun (born 1970), South Korean violinist
Jeanne You (Korean name You Ji-yeoun; born 1978), South Korean classical pianist
Ji-Yeon Yuh, American sociologist of Korean descent

Fictional characters
Kwon Ji-yeon, in American television series Lost, for whom the episode Ji-yeon is named
Jee-Yun Buckley Han, in American television series 9-1-1

See also
List of Korean given names

References

Korean feminine given names